Croft Farm was a short-lived railway station in Longbridge on what is now the Cross City Line. It was opened on 17 September 1840 and closed 17 December 1840 but later reopened in November 1841 and closed completely in December 1843.
see also entry for Cofton railway station.

References

Former Midland Railway stations
Railway stations in Great Britain opened in 1840
Railway stations in Great Britain closed in 1840
Railway stations in Great Britain opened in 1841
Railway stations in Great Britain closed in 1843